Sardha (also Romanized as Sardhā and Sardahā; also known as Sardara and Sardora) is a village in Howmeh Rural District, in the Central District of Sarab County, East Azerbaijan Province, Iran. At the 2006 census, its population was 1,230, in 324 families.

References 

Populated places in Sarab County